Omaha Kaleidoscope was a brief-lived countercultural, antiwar underground newspaper published in Omaha, Nebraska in 1971. Edited by Tim Andrews and published monthly (later biweekly) in a tabloid format, it was part of the small Kaleidoscope chain of underground newspapers based in Milwaukee, Wisconsin. The first issue was dated Feb. 10, 1971.

See also
 List of underground newspapers of the 1960s counterculture

Notes

Newspapers published in Omaha, Nebraska
Underground press